Wesley is an unincorporated community and census-designated place (CDP) in western Madison County, Arkansas, United States. Wesley is located at the junction of Arkansas highways 74 and 295,  by road west-southwest of Huntsville. Wesley has a post office with ZIP code 72773. It was first listed as a CDP in the 2020 census with a population of 161.

History
Wesley was platted in 1872. The first postmaster gave the community his last name.

Demographics

2020 census

Note: the US Census treats Hispanic/Latino as an ethnic category. This table excludes Latinos from the racial categories and assigns them to a separate category. Hispanics/Latinos can be of any race.

References

Unincorporated communities in Madison County, Arkansas
Unincorporated communities in Arkansas
Census-designated places in Madison County, Arkansas
Census-designated places in Arkansas